Lu is a Chinese surname. It is also spelled Lo according to the Cantonese pronunciation. Lu 路 is listed 138th in the Song Dynasty classic text Hundred Family Surnames. Lu 路 is the 116th most common surname in China, with a total population of 2.35 million.

Demographics and distribution
As of 2013, Lu 路 is the 116th most common surname in China, shared by 2.35 million people, or 0.18% of the Chinese population. It is distributed widely across China, but the provinces of Hebei, Shandong, Anhui, and Henan have especially high concentrations of the surname; the four provinces account for 70% of the total population with the surname.

Origins
In 594 BC Lushi was conquered by Duke Jing, the ruler of the State of Jin, a major power of the Spring and Autumn period. The people of Lu/Lushi subsequently adopted Lu 路 as their surname.

Another origin of Lu 路 is the Western Zhou Dynasty (1046–771 BC) government office of luzheng (路正), which was responsible for the management of roads and transportation (Lu 路 means road in Chinese). Some descendants of people who held the office adopted Lu as their surname.

A third, legendary origin of Lu 路 is from Xuanyuan (玄元), a son of Emperor Zhi and grandson of Emperor Ku. He was enfeoffed as Marquis of Luzhong (路中侯) by Emperor Yao, and his descendants adopted Lu (from Luzhong) as their surname.

Later adoption
During the Xianbei Northern Wei dynasty, Emperor Xiaowen (reigned 467–499 AD) implemented a drastic policy of sinicization, ordering his own people to adopt Chinese surnames. The Moluzhen (没路真) tribe of Xianbei adopted Lu 路 as their surname.

Some of the Dong people, an ethnic minority group of China, have also adopted Lu 路 as their surname.

Notable people
 Lu Bode (路博德; fl. 119–109 BC), Western Han general, conqueror of Nanyue and Hainan
 Lu Wenshu (路温舒), Western Han scholar
 Lu Huinan (路惠男; 412–466), empress dowager of the Liu Song dynasty
 Empress Lu, consort of Emperor Qianfei of Liu Song, niece of Lu Huinan
 Lu Sui (路隨; 776–835), Tang dynasty chancellor
 Lu Yan (路巖; 829–874), Tang dynasty chancellor
 Lu Zhongyi (路中一; 1849–1925), religious leader
 Lu Yongxiang (路甬祥; born 1942), former president of the Chinese Academy of Sciences
 Lu Yao (路遥; 1949–1992), writer
 Ping Lu (路平; Lu Ping; born 1953), Taiwanese writer
 Lu Xuechang (路学长; 1964–2014), film director
 Jozie Lu (路嘉欣; Lu Jiaxin; born 1979), Taiwanese actress and singer
 Lu Jiang (路姜; born 1981), football player
 Lu Chen (路晨; born 1987), actress
 Johnny Lu (路斯明), born Johnny Chen, Taiwanese-American actor
 Suyin Lu, born in Philippines, Soon to be CPA

References

Chinese-language surnames
Individual Chinese surnames